Críchad an Chaoilli ("boundary of the Caoille") is a medieval Irish text.

Overview

Written in Middle Irish sometime between 1100 and 1300, Críchad an Chaoilli is a topographical text that takes its title from its opening verse:
 Crichad an caoilli gu cruaidh
 in fuil uaibh nech noimluaidh ?
 tucad do mac Sonaisc sin
 ar an forbhais d'fhoirdhin 

which translates as

The exact boundary of the Caoille,
is there anyone of you who would describe it?
It was given to the son of Sonasc
for assisting at the siege.

The rest of the text is written in prose, and describes the land and proprietors of Fermoy, County Cork, an area originally known as the kingdom of Caoille or Fir Maige Féne.

It survives in two manuscripts – Book of Lismore, on folio 140a, 2; and in Egerton 92, fo. 13b, preserved in the British Library, London.

Authorship

Its unknown author is thought to have been a monastic scribe.

See also

 Crichaireacht cinedach nduchasa Muintiri Murchada
 Triallam timcheall na Fodla
 Seán Mór Ó Dubhagáin
 Giolla na Naomh Ó hUidhrín

External links
 http://www.ucc.ie/celt/published/G100063/index.html

References

Manuscript sources

 Cork, University College Cork, Book of Lismore, fo. 140a, 2.
 London, British Library, Egerton 92, fo. 13b.

Editions

 J. G. O'Keeffe (ed.), The ancient territory of Fermoy, Ériu 10 (1926–28), 170–89.
 P. Power (ed.), Crichad an Chaoilli being the Topography of Ancient Fermoy (Dublin 1932).

Articles

 Eithne Donnelly, The Roches, Lords of Fermoy: the history of a Norman-Irish family, in Journal of the Cork Historical and Archaeological Society39 (1934), 38–40, 57–68; 40 (1935), 37–42, 63–73; 41 (1936), 20–28, 78–84; 42 (1937), 40–52.
 T. F. O'Rahilly, Some Fermoy placenames, Ériu, 12 (1938), 254–256.
 Liam Ó Buachalla, Placenames of north-east Cork, J.C.H.A.S. 54 (1949) 31–34.
 Liam Ó Buachalla, Contributions towards the political history of Munster, in J.C.H.A.S. 56 (1951), 87–90; 57 (1952) 67–86; 59 (1954) 111–26; 61 (1956) 89–102.
 Liam Ó Buachalla, Townland development in the Fermoy area, 12th century–19th century, Dinnseanchas 1 (1965), 87–92.
 Liam Ó Buachalla, An early fourteenth-century placenames list for Anglo-Norman Cork, Dinnseanchas 3/2 (1967), 39–50.
 F. X. Martin, The first Normans in Munster, in J.C.H.A.S. 76 (1971), 48–71.
 Niall Brunicardi, Fermoy to 1790: a local history (Fermoy: Eigse na Mainistreach), 1975.
 C. J. F. MacCarthy, Éigse Chaoille: an introduction to the literature of ancient Fermoy, in Mallow Field Club Journal 6 (1988) 134–155.
 Kenneth Nicholls, The development of Lordship in County Cork, 1300–1600, in: P. O'Flanagan and C.G. Buttimer (eds), Cork History and Society. Interdisciplinary Essays on the history of an Irish County (Dublin 1993) 157–211.
 Donnchadh Ó Corráin, Corcu Loígde: land and families, in O'Flanagan and Buttimer, Cork History and Society, 63–81.
 Paul MacCotter & K. W. Nicholls, The pipe roll of Cloyne (Rotulus pipæ Clonensis), Cloyne, Midleton, Co. Cork, 1996.
 Diarmuid Ó Murchadha, Cenn Ebrat, Sliab Caín, Belach Ebrat, Belach Legtha/Lechta, Éigse 29 (1996), 153–71.
 M. A. Monk & John Sheehan (eds), Early Munster: Archaeology, Sistory and Society (Cork 1998) 59–64.
 Denise Power et al., Archaeological inventory of County Cork (4 vols, Dublin 1992–2000).
 J. O'Meara, Mallow-Fermoy-Mitchelstown, in Journal of the Irish Railway Record Society 22 (2004) pp. 17–33.
 Edel Bhreathnach, Críchad an Chaoilli: a medieval territory revealed, in J.C.H.A.S, 110 (2005), pp. 85–96.
 Paul MacCotter, Medieval Ireland: territorial, political and economic divisions, Dublin, 2008.

Irish texts
Irish manuscripts
Irish-language literature
12th-century manuscripts
13th-century manuscripts
12th-century documents
13th-century documents
Medieval genealogies and succession lists
Irish books